Björneborg may refer to:

 Björneborg, Sweden
 the Swedish name of Pori, city of Finland